"So Much to Say" is a song by American rock group Dave Matthews Band. It was released in August 1996 as the second single from their album, Crash. The song won the Grammy Award for Best Rock Performance by a Duo or Group with Vocal at the 39th Annual Grammy Awards in 1997.

"So Much to Say" reached #19 on the Modern Rock Tracks chart.

Track listing

U.S. single
"So Much to Say" (Album Version) — 4:06
"So Much to Say" (Edit) — 3:05

Australian single
"So Much to Say" (Edit) — 3:05
"So Much to Say" (Album Version) — 4:06
"#41" (Live at Luther College) — 5:30

Charts

References

1996 singles
Dave Matthews Band songs
Songs written by Dave Matthews
Song recordings produced by Steve Lillywhite
Songs written by Boyd Tinsley
1996 songs